The 2011–12 Melbourne Aces season was the second season for the team. As was the case for the previous season, the Aces will compete in the Australian Baseball League (ABL) with the other five foundation teams, and will again play its home games at the Royal Melbourne Showgrounds.

Offseason 
During the offseason, it was announced that the Aces' home ground, the Royal Melbourne Showgrounds, would undergo major reconstruction in preparation for this season. Among others, the most notable change involved moving home plate approximately 15 feet closer to the fence, increasing the length of the field to 400 feet at centre field. The ground was previously noted for its size among ABL grounds, having accounted for over 42% of all home runs hit during the inaugural ABL season.

Regular season

Standings

Record vs opponents

Game log 

|- style="background:#fbb;"
| 1
| 4 November
| @ 
| L 3–2
| Chris Oxspring (1–0)
| Daniel McGrath (0–1)
| 
| 1,193
| 0–1
| 
|- style="background:#fbb;"
| 2
| 5 November (DH 1)
| @ 
| L 8–6
| Matthew Williams (1–0)
| Andrew Mann (0–1)
| Koo Dae-Sung (1)
| —
| 0–2
| 
|- style="background:#bfb;"
| 3
| 5 November (DH 2)
| @ 
| W 13–9
| Blake Cunningham (1–0)
| Josh Wells (0–1)
| 
| 1,295
| 1–2
| 
|- style="background:#fbb;"
| 4
| 6 November
| @ 
| L 2–0
| Chris Oxspring (2–0)
| Sam Gibbons (0–1)
| 
| 1,425
| 1–3
| 
|- style="background:#fbb;"
| 5
| 11 November
| 
| L 6–3
| Daniel Schmidt (1–0)
| Shane Lindsay (0–1)
| Benn Grice (2)
| 1,514
| 1–4
| 
|- style="background:#fbb;"
| 6
| 12 November
| 
| L 9–8
| Trevor Caughey (1–0)
| Yusei Kikuchi (0–1)
| Matt Erikson (1)
| 1,174
| 1–5
| 
|- style="background:#fbb;"
| 7
| 13 November (DH 1)
| 
| L 6–1
| Jacob Clem (1–0)
| Jason Hirsh (0–1)
| 
| —
| 1–6
| 
|- style="background:#fbb;"
| 8
| 13 November (DH 2)
| 
| L 5–3
| Warwick Saupold (1–0)
| Nic Ungs (0–1)
| 
| 923
| 1–7
| 
|-
| 9
| 17 November
| 
| –
| 
| 
| 
| 
| 
| 
|-
| 10
| 18 November
| 
| –
| 
| 
| 
| 
| 
| 
|-
| 11
| 19 November
| 
| –
| 
| 
| 
| 
| 
| 
|-
| 12
| 20 November
| 
| –
| 
| 
| 
| 
| 
| 
|-
| 13
| 24 November
| @ 
| –
| 
| 
| 
| 
| 
| 
|-
| 14
| 25 November
| @ 
| –
| 
| 
| 
| 
| 
| 
|-
| 15
| 26 November
| @ 
| –
| 
| 
| 
| 
| 
| 
|-
| 16
| 27 November
| @ 
| –
| 
| 
| 
| 
| 
| 
|-

|-
| 17
| 1 December
| @ 
| –
| 
| 
| 
| 
| 
| 
|-
| 18
| 2 December (DH 1)
| @ 
| –
| 
| 
| 
| 
| 
| 
|-
| 19
| 2 December (DH 2)
| @ 
| –
| 
| 
| 
| 
| 
| 
|-
| 20
| 3 December
| @ 
| –
| 
| 
| 
| 
| 
| 
|-
| 21
| 16 December
| @ 
| –
| 
| 
| 
| 
| 
| 
|-
| 22
| 17 December
| @ 
| –
| 
| 
| 
| 
| 
| 
|-
| 23
| 18 December
| @ 
| –
| 
| 
| 
| 
| 
| 
|-
| 24
| 19 December
| @ 
| –
| 
| 
| 
| 
| 
| 
|-
| 25
| 20 December
| @ 
| –
| 
| 
| 
| 
| 
| 
|-
| 26
| 29 December
| 
| –
| 
| 
| 
| 
| 
| 
|-
| 27
| 30 December
| 
| –
| 
| 
| 
| 
| 
| 
|-
| 28
| 31 December (DH 1)
| 
| –
| 
| 
| 
| 
| 
| 
|-
| 29
| 31 December (DH 2)
| 
| –
| 
| 
| 
| 
| 
| 
|-

|-
| 30
| 1 January
| 
| –
| 
| 
| 
| 
| 
| 
|-
| 31
| 5 January
| 
| –
| 
| 
| 
| 
| 
| 
|-
| 32
| 6 January
| 
| –
| 
| 
| 
| 
| 
| 
|-
| 33
| 7 January (DH 1)
| 
| –
| 
| 
| 
| 
| 
| 
|-
| 34
| 7 January (DH 2)
| 
| –
| 
| 
| 
| 
| 
| 
|-
| 35
| 8 January
| 
| –
| 
| 
| 
| 
| 
| 
|-
| 36
| 11 January
| @ 
| –
| 
| 
| 
| 
| 
| 
|-
| 37
| 12 January
| @ 
| –
| 
| 
| 
| 
| 
| 
|-
| 38
| 13 January
| @ 
| –
| 
| 
| 
| 
| 
| 
|-
| 39
| 14 January
| @ 
| –
| 
| 
| 
| 
| 
| 
|-
| 40
| 15 January
| @ 
| –
| 
| 
| 
| 
| 
| 
|-
| 41
| 18 January
| 
| –
| 
| 
| 
| 
| 
| 
|-
| 42
| 19 January
| 
| –
| 
| 
| 
| 
| 
| 
|-
| 43
| 20 January
| 
| –
| 
| 
| 
| 
| 
| 
|-
| 44
| 21 January (DH 1)
| 
| –
| 
| 
| 
| 
| 
| 
|-
| 45
| 21 January (DH 2)
| 
| –
| 
| 
| 
| 
| 
| 
|-

Roster

References 

Melbourne Aces
Melbourne Aces